Qasím Khan (or Qasim of Kasimov) (died 1469) was the first khan of the Tatar Qasim Khanate, from 1452 to his death in 1469. He was the son of Kazan khan Oluğ Möxämmäd.

He participated in the battles of Belyov in 1437 and of Suzdal in 1445. After the Battle of Suzdal, he and his brother Yaqub were sent to Moscow to control the results of the treaty. He stayed at the palace of Vasili II of Russia to serve him. (When his father died in 1445 the Kazan throne went to his elder brother Mäxmüd which may have something to do with his decision to enter Russian service.) In 1449 at the Pakhra river near Moscow he defeated troops of Sayid Ahmad I, the khan of the Great Horde, that came to conquer Muscovy. In 1447–1453 he supported Vasili in his struggle against Dmitry Shemyaka. In 1452 Vasili II granted him a principality in Ryazan Principality, in territory formerly of Mishar Yurt, as a hereditary estate and Kasimov city. Those lands were designated the Qasim Khanate. During the 1467–1469 war the Russians attempted to make him Khan of Kazan. In 1469 he was followed by his son Daniyal.

See also
Mäxmüd
Kasimov

References
Henry Hoyle Howorth, History of the Mongols, 1880, Part 2, pp 429–230

Qasim Khanate
15th-century births
1469 deaths
15th-century monarchs in Europe